Bobâlna (Olpret until 1957;) is a commune in Cluj County, Transylvania, Romania, having a population of 1,888. It is composed of eleven villages: Antăș (Antos), Băbdiu (Zápróc), Blidărești (Tálosfalva), Bobâlna, Cremenea (Keménye), Maia (Mánya), Oșorhel (Erdővásárhely), Pruni (Nagymező), Răzbuneni (Radákszinye), Suarăș (Szóváros) and Vâlcelele (Bujdos). It is situated in the historical region of Transylvania.

The first document that mentions the village is from 1332. This village was the place where the 15th century Bobâlna revolt started.

Demographics 
According to the census from 2002 there was a total population of 1,888 people living in this town. Of this population, 99.76% are ethnic Romanians, 1.85% ethnic Romani and 1.37% are ethnic Hungarians.

Natives 
 Ferenc Barlabássy (c. 1540–1599), Hungarian nobleman
 Alexandru Vaida-Voevod (1872–1950), politician, served as Prime Minister of Romania

References 

Communes in Cluj County
Localities in Transylvania